Gorbunovo is a rural locality (a village) in Lobanovskoye Rural Settlement, Permsky District, Perm Krai, Russia. The population was 191 as of 2010. There are 11 streets.

Geography 
Gorbunovo is located 23 km southeast of Perm (the district's administrative centre) by road. Balandino is the nearest rural locality.

References 

Rural localities in Permsky District